The 71st District of the Iowa House of Representatives in the state of Iowa.

Current elected officials
Sue Cahill is the representative currently representing the district.

Past representatives
The district has previously been represented by:
 Richard F. Drake, 1971–1973
 Emil J. Husak, 1973–1981
 Janet Carl, 1981–1983
 Dennis Black, 1983–1993
 Thomas Baker, 1993–1997
 Wayne Ford, 1997–2003
 Jim Van Engelenhoven, 2003–2013
 Mark Smith, 2013–2021
 Sue Cahill, 2021–present

References

071